The Dutch Eerste Divisie in the 1991–92 season was contested by 20 teams. TOP Oss from the amateurs replaced Dordrecht '90 who had merged with eredivisie-club SVV. Cambuur Leeuwarden won the championship.

New entrants
Entering from amateur football
 TOP Oss
Relegated from the 1990–91 Eredivisie
 sc Heerenveen
 NEC Nijmegen
''VC Vlissingen changed their name for this season to VCV Zeeland.

League standings

Promotion/relegation play-offs
The promotion/relegation play-offs consisted of three rounds. In the group round, four period winners (the best teams during each of the four quarters of the regular competition) and two (other) best placed teams in the league, played in two groups of three teams. The group winners would play in play-off 1. The winners of that play-off would be promoted to the Eredivisie, the loser had to take on the number 16 of the Eredivisie in play-off 2. These two teams played for the third and last position in the Eredivisie of next season.

Play-off 1

BVV Den Bosch: promoted to Eredivisie 
Go Ahead Eagles: play-off 2

Play-off 2

Go Ahead Eagles: promoted to Eredivisie 
FC Den Haag: relegated to Eerste Divisie

See also
 1991–92 Eredivisie
 1991–92 KNVB Cup

References
Netherlands - List of final tables (RSSSF)

Eerste Divisie seasons
2
Neth